Geng Zhiqing (born 10 September 1991) is a Chinese footballer currently playing as a defender for Chinese club Hefei City.

Career statistics

Club
.

Notes

References

1991 births
Living people
Footballers from Dalian
Footballers from Liaoning
Chinese footballers
Association football defenders
China League One players
China League Two players
Shaoxing Keqiao Yuejia F.C. players
Jiangxi Beidamen F.C. players
21st-century Chinese people